The following is a list of episodes from the series Gigantosaurus.

Series overview

Season 1 (2019-20)
All episodes in this season were written by Dave Benjoya, Wagner Cardena, Mike De Seve, Jordan Gershowitz, Baptiste Grosfilley, Bart Jennett, Suzanne Lang, Charles Henri Moarbes, Jacqueline Moody, Pierre Olivier, Maria O’Loughlin, Annabelle Perrichon, Cécile Polard, Franck Salome, Nicolas Seidel, Alain Vallejo, Joseph Vitale, and Fernando Worcel and storyboarded by Jérémie Bouet, Nadia Brahimi, Farouk Cherfi, Pierre Fassel, Miguel Gaban, Ahmed Gerrouache, Sylvain Girault, and Philippe Saunier.

Season 2 (2021)
All episodes were written by Hervé Benedetti, Françoise Boubil, Wagner Cardena, Shannon George, Jordan Gershowitz, Baptise Grosfilley, Anais LeBeau, Laura Macler, Jacqueline Moody, Diane Morel, Eric Noto, Annabelle Perrichon, Cécile Polard, Nicolas Robin, Franck Salome, Nicolas Sedel, Kevin Strader, Alain Vallejo, and Fernando Worcel and Storyboarded by Jerémie Bouet, Nadia Brahimi, Fraçois Caillier, Farouk Cherfi, Paul-Henri Ferrant, Miguel Gaban, Fabrice Leminier, Elvira Pinto, Hélène Sauvagnat, and Sandrine Sekulak.

Season 3 (2021-22)
All episodes were written by Hervé Benedetti, Françoise Boubil, Wagner Cardena, Shannon George, Jordan Gershowitz, Baptise Grosfilley, Anais LeBeau, Laura Macler, Jacqueline Moody, Diane Morel, Eric Noto, Annabelle Perrichon, Cécile Polard, Nicolas Robin, Franck Salome, Nicolas Sedel, Kevin Strader, Alain Vallejo, and Fernando Worcel and Storyboarded by Jerémie Bouet, Nadia Brahimi, Fraçois Caillier, Farouk Cherfi, Paul-Henri Ferrant, Miguel Gaban, Fabrice Leminier, Elvira Pinto, Hélène Sauvagnat, and Sandrine Sekulak.

References

Gigantosaurus
Gigantosaurus
Gigantosaurus episodes
Gigantosaurus episodes